Marko Spasojević (born 3 October 1990) is a Serbian football midfielder.

References

External links
 

1990 births
Living people
Sportspeople from Kruševac
Association football midfielders
Serbian footballers
FK Napredak Kruševac players
RFK Novi Sad 1921 players
FK Kolubara players
FK Jedinstvo Užice players
Serbian SuperLiga players